The 1914 Alabama gubernatorial election took place on November 3, 1914, in order to elect the governor of Alabama. Democratic incumbent Emmet O'Neal was term-limited, and could not seek a second consecutive term.

Results

References

1914
gubernatorial
Alabama
November 1914 events